Haridas or Haridasa may refer to:
 Haridas (1944 film), a 1944 Indian Tamil-language film
 Haridas (2013 film), a 2013 Indian art film
 Haridasa, devotee of the god Vishnu in the Bhakti movement of Hinduism

People
 Haridas Kesaria (d. 1527), a warrior and poet from Mewar 
 Haridas Bhattacharya (1891–1956), Indian philosopher, author and educationist
 Haridas Chaudhuri (1913–1975), Indian philosopher affiliated with Aurobindo 
 Haridas Dutta (1890–1976), Indian revolutionary and freedom fighter
 Haridas Giri, Indian saint
 Haridas Mundhra, Calcutta-based industrialist and stock speculator
 Haridas Niranjani, an Indian saint poet believed to have lived in the 16th and 17th centuries
 Haridas Pal, fictional Indian character
 Haridas Shastri (1918–2013), Indian Gaudiya Vaisnava scholar and practitioner
 Haridas Siddhanta Bagish, Indian writer and translator
 Haridas Viharidas Desai (1840–1895), Diwan of Junagadh state from 1883
 Haridasa Thakur (1450s–?), prominent follower of Chaitanya Mahaprabhu, a convert from Islam
 Hiresh Haridas, Indo-Malaysian singer-songwriter
 K. K. Haridas (1965–2018), Indian director
 K. P. Haridas, Indian surgeon
 Kalamandalam Haridas (1946–2005), Kathakali musician
 Nanabhai Haridas (1832–1889), first Indian Justice of the Bombay High Court during
 Neena Haridas (born 1973), Indian journalist and writer
 Rahul Haridas, Indian film actor
 Ramya Haridas (born 1987), Indian politician and social worker
 Ranjini Haridas, Indian television anchor, movie artist, and model
 Sadhu Haridas, 19th century yogi and fakir
 Swami Haridas, saint-musician and a pioneer in the Hindustani classical music

See also
 Hari (disambiguation)